John Wayne (1907–1979) was an American actor and filmmaker.

John Wayne may also refer to:

 P-38 can opener, U.S. military equipment sometimes known as the "John Wayne"
 John Wayne Airport, Orange County, California
 John Wayne Elementary School

Music 
 "John Wayne" (song) by Lady Gaga
 "John Wayne", a song from Billy Idol's 2008 album The Very Best of Billy Idol: Idolize Yourself
 "John Wayne", a song from Cigarettes After Sex's 2017 self-titled album
 "John Wayne", a song from Electrelane's 2006 album Singles, B-Sides & Live
 John Wayne, an album by Terry Scott Taylor

See also 
 
 John Wayne Parkway, Arizona State Route 347
 John Wayne Pioneer Trail
 Taborcillo (a.k.a. John Wayne Island), a small private island off the coast of Panama once owned by John Wayne
 John Wain
 John Waine
 John Bayne (disambiguation)
 Johnny Wayne (1918–1990), Canadian comedian
 Jon Wayne, an American cowpunk band active in the 1980s
 Jonwayne, American hip-hop artist and rapper